Einārs, or Einars, is a Latvian masculine given name, which is the cognate of the given name Einar. People bearing the name Einārs include:

Einars Gņedojs (born 1965), Latvian footballer
Einars Repše (born 1961), Latvian politician, physicist, financier
Einārs Tupurītis (born 1973), Latvian middle distance runner

References

Latvian masculine given names